Horatio is an unincorporated community in Darke County, in the U.S. state of Ohio.

History
A post office called Horatio was established in 1860, and remained in operation until 1920. Besides the post office, Horatio had a church and a country store.

References

Unincorporated communities in Darke County, Ohio
Unincorporated communities in Ohio